The Rigorous Fate (also released as The Sternness of Fate) is a 1985 Argentine drama film directed by Gerardo Vallejo. It was entered into the 14th Moscow International Film Festival.

Cast
 Alberto Benegas
 Carlos Carella
 Fred Carneano
 Víctor Laplace
 Leonor Manso
 Ana María Picchio
 Susana Romero

References

External links
 

1985 films
1985 drama films
1980s Spanish-language films
Argentine drama films
1980s Argentine films